John Stanley Ragin (May 5, 1929 - April 14, 2013) was an American television and film actor. He was best known for his role as uptight bureaucratic Dr. Robert Asten, M.E. in the TV series Quincy, M.E. (1976–83).

Early years
Ragin was born in Newark, New Jersey. He attended Rutgers University on a scholarship but later changed to Carnegie Tech. He studied in Europe with two grants from the Fulbright Program.

Career
Ragin appeared in mostly supporting roles in television series such as  Alfred Hitchcock Presents, The Invaders, Cannon, McCloud, Murder, She Wrote and Star Trek: The Next Generation. He also appeared in smaller roles in a few films such as Earthquake,  The Parallax View and Doctors' Wives.

Ragin played Walter Cramer in the short-lived 1974 CBS TV series Sons and Daughters. He had a short-term stint as Dr. Grant Jameson on  the daytime soap opera Santa Barbara during 1990-91.

Death
Ragin died in Los Angeles on April 14, 2013, at the age of 83.

Filmography

Films
 Doctors' Wives (1971) .... Minister (uncredited)
 Copernicus (1973) .... Narrator (voice)
 The Parallax View (1974) .... Buster Himan
 Earthquake (1974) .... Chief Inspector
 Moving Violation (1976) .... Agent Shank

Television work

 Alfred Hitchcock Presents (1 episode, 1960) .... Fletcher
 Armstrong Circle Theatre (1 episode, 1960) .... Pettigrew
 Naked City (1 episode, 1963) .... Mr. Warstein
 Gomer Pyle, U.S.M.C. (1 episode, 1965) .... Lieutenant
 The F.B.I. (4 episodes, 1966–1974) .... Gary Burgess
 Felony Squad (4 episodes, 1966–1968) .... Dr. Kern
 Blue Light (2 episodes, 1966) .... Zimmer
 Laredo (1 episode, 1966) .... Karl
 The Invaders (2 episodes, 1967) .... John Finney
 Love on a Rooftop (1 episode, 1967) .... Charlie
 Get Smart (2 episodes, 1968) .... Kendall
 The Wild Wild West (1 episode, 1968) .... Rev. Hastings
 The Outsider (1 episode, 1968) .... Todd Elkins
 Ironside (3 episodes, 1969–1972) .... Congressman Lowery
 The Bold Ones: The New Doctors (2 episodes, 1969–1971) .... Dr. Gomrick
 The Bold Ones: The Lawyers (3 episodes, 1969–1971) .... Arresting Officer
 The Lonely Profession (1969, TV Movie) .... Mr. Sutton - FBI
 Mission: Impossible .... (2 episodes, 1970) .... Pharmacist / Butler
 The Most Deadly Game (1 episode, 1970) .... Biff Porter
 Storefront Lawyers (2 episodes, 1971) .... Spencer Pawling / Attorney
 Powderkeg (1971) .... Muncie - hotel clerk
 Night Gallery (1 episode, 1971) .... 1st Policeman (segment "They're Tearing Down Tim Riley's Bar")
 The Forgotten Man (1971, TV Movie) .... Major Parkman
 Alias Smith and Jones (1 episode, 1971) .... Edward Fielding
 Cool Million (1 episode, 1972) .... Fred Harrison
 Barnaby Jones (2 episodes, 1973–1975) .... Eddie R. Davis
 Mannix (1 episode, 1973) .... Burns
 Sons and Daughters (9 episodes, 1974) .... Walter Cramer
 The Six Million Dollar Man (1 episode, 1974) .... Flight Director
 Cannon (1 episode, 1974) .... Chief Inspector
 Killer Bees (1974, TV Movie) .... Sergeant Jeffreys
 Love Is Not Forever (1974, TV Movie) .... Walter Cramer
  The Rookies (1 episode, 1975) .... Bryan McNeal
 Switch (1 episode, 1975) .... Len Ekhardt
 Delancey Street: The Crisis Within (1975, TV Movie) .... Jeff Donaldson
 Quincy M.E. (144 episodes, 1976–1983) .... Dr. Robert Astin
 McCloud (1 episode, 1976) .... Mr. Jessup
 Harry O (1 episode, 1976) .... John Wesler
 City of Angels (1 episode, 1976) .... Robert Sand
 The Amazing Howard Hughes (1977, TV Movie) .... McKenna
 The Islander (1978, TV Movie) .... Bishop Hatch
 B.J. and the Bear (1 episode, 1980) .... Dr. Robert Asten
 Emerald Point N.A.S. (1 episode, 1983) .... Admiral Lovell
 Riptide (1 episode, 1986) .... Lewis Gordon
 Murder, She Wrote (1 episode, 1987) .... Dr. Cliff Strayhorn
 Airwolf (1 episode, 1987) .... Dr. Kinsington
 Santa Barbara (unknown episodes, 1990–1991) .... Dr. Grant Jameson
 Star Trek: The Next Generation (1993, episode: "Suspicions") .... Dr. Christopher (final appearance)

References

External links

Obituary
Ragin is listed under this page's in memoriam-section.
John S. Ragin at Find a Grave

1929 births
2013 deaths
American male film actors
American male television actors
20th-century American male actors
Burials at Forest Lawn Memorial Park (Glendale)
Male actors from Newark, New Jersey